Recklinghausen II is an electoral constituency (German: Wahlkreis) represented in the Bundestag. It elects one member via first-past-the-post voting. Under the current constituency numbering system, it is designated as constituency 122. It is located in the Ruhr region of North Rhine-Westphalia, comprising the northern and eastern part of the Recklinghausen district.

Recklinghausen II was created for the inaugural 1949 federal election. Since 2021, it has been represented by Brian Nickholz of the Social Democratic Party (SPD).

Geography
Recklinghausen II is located in the Ruhr region of North Rhine-Westphalia. As of the 2021 federal election, it comprises the municipalities of Datteln, Haltern am See, Herten, Marl, and Oer-Erkenschwick from the Recklinghausen district.

History
Recklinghausen II was created in 1949, then known as Recklinghausen-Land. From 1980 through 1987, it was named Recklinghausen II. From 1990 through 1998, it was named Recklinghausen II – Borken I. It acquired its current name in the 2002 election. In the 1949 election, it was North Rhine-Westphalia constituency 41 in the numbering system. From 1953 through 1961, it was number 100. From 1965 through 1976, it was number 99. From 1980 through 1998, it was number 92. From 2002 through 2009, it was number 123. Since 2013, it has been number 122.

Originally, the constituency was coterminous with the Recklinghausen district. From 1965 through 1976, it comprised the municipalities of Dorsten, Herten, Kirchhellen, Marl, and Westerholt from the Recklinghausen district. From 1980 through 1987, it comprised the municipalities of Datteln, Dorsten, Haltern am See, Marl, and Oer-Erkenschwick. In the 1990 and 1994 elections, it acquired the municipalities of Heiden and Reken from the Borken district. In the 1998 election, it also acquired Raesfeld from the Borken district. It acquired its current borders in the 2002 election.

Members
The constituency has been held continuously by the Social Democratic Party (SPD) since 1965. It was first represented by Anton Hoppe of the Christian Democratic Union (CDU) from 1949 to 1953, followed by fellow CDU member Friedrich Wilhelm Willeke from 1953 to 1965. Günther Eckerland of the SPD was elected in 1965 and served until 1976, when he was succeeded by Ulrich Steger. He was in turn succeeded by Horst Niggemeier, who served from 1987 to 1994. Waltraud Lehn was representative from 1994 to 2009. Michael Groß was elected in 2009, and re-elected in 2013 and 2017. He was succeeded by Brian Nickholz in 2021.

Election results

2021 election

2017 election

2013 election

2009 election

References

Federal electoral districts in North Rhine-Westphalia
1949 establishments in West Germany
Constituencies established in 1949
Recklinghausen (district)